Jeremy Loughman (born 22 July 1995) is an Irish rugby union player for United Rugby Championship and European Rugby Champions Cup side Munster. Internationally, Loughman made his senior debut for Ireland in 2022. He plays as a prop.

Early life
Loughman was born in Reno, Nevada and lived there until his was four-years-old, when his family moved to Sevenoaks, Kent due to his fathers work in the oil and gas industry. The family stayed there for eight years before moving to Athy, County Kildare, where Loughman first played rugby for Athy RFC, while he attended Árdscoil na Tríonóide and was capped at Leinster Under-18 Youths level. He then moved to Blackrock College, Dublin for his fifth and sixth year, where he won the Leinster Schools Rugby Senior Cup in 2013 and 2014.

Munster
Loughman joined Munster on a three-month development contract in December 2017, having previously been a member of the Leinster Academy. He made his first appearance for Munster A on 8 December 2017, featuring off the bench in the provinces' 25–14 defeat against Bedford Blues in the 2017–18 British and Irish Cup. He made his debut for Munster on 1 January 2018, coming on as a replacement for James Cronin in the 2017–18 Pro14 fixture against Ulster. Loughman's contract was extended until the end of the 2017–18 season in April 2018, before being extended again for the whole of the 2018–19 season.

Loughman signed a one-year contract extension with Munster in December 2018. Loughman made his Champions Cup debut for Munster on 9 December 2018, featuring off the bench in their 30–5 win against French pool 2 opponents Castres. He scored his first try for Munster in their 31–12 win against Zebre on 23 March 2019. In his first Champions Cup start for Munster, in their opening 2019–20 tournament pool 4 fixture against Welsh side Ospreys on 16 November 2019, Loughman won the Man-of-the-Match award and scored a try in the provinces 32–13 away win.

Loughman signed a two-year contract with Munster in February 2020, a deal that will see him remain with the province until at least June 2022. He earned his 50th cap for Munster in their 38–10 win against Ulster in round 2 of the Pro14 Rainbow Cup on 7 May 2021. Loughman signed a two-year contract extension in January 2022.

International career
Loughman received his first senior international call-up when he was brought into the Ireland squad by head coach Andy Farrell ahead of their Six Nations round 4 fixture against England in March 2022, and was also selected in the squad for the 2022 Ireland rugby union tour of New Zealand. Loughman made his first appearance for Ireland when he started in their uncapped match against the Māori All Blacks on 29 June, however, he was removed from the field in the first minute for a head injury assessment. Loughman appeared to display symptoms of concussion, but passed the assessment by an independent doctor and returned to the field, only to be removed permanently at half-time as a precaution. Progressive Rugby, who advocate for greater welfare in rugby, criticised the decision to allow Loughman to return to the field, though Ireland head coach Andy Farrell defended the decision, insisting that Loughman passed the necessary tests but was removed at half-time in the best interests of Loughman himself.

New Zealand Rugby later admitted that a "communications gap" was responsible for allowing Loughman to return to the field and that, as Loughman was displaying symptoms of concussion, the head injury assessment was not necessary, as World Rugby guidelines stipulate that a player displaying such symptoms be immediately removed from play. Loughman was then ruled  out of Ireland's first test against New Zealand on 2 July, but returned to start in the second uncapped match against the Māori All Blacks on 12 July, which Ireland won 30–24 to draw the series 1–1. Loughman started for Ireland A in their 47–19 defeat against an All Blacks XV on 4 November 2022, and made his senior international debut for Ireland eight days later when he started in their 35–17 win against Fiji during the 2022 Autumn Nations Series.

References

External links

Ireland Profile
Leinster Profile
Munster Profile
URC Profile

U20 Six Nations Profile

Living people
1995 births
Sportspeople from Reno, Nevada
People educated at Blackrock College
Irish rugby union players
University College Dublin R.F.C. players
Leinster Rugby players
Munster Rugby players
Ireland Wolfhounds international rugby union players
Ireland international rugby union players
Rugby union props